= Tourist Organisation of Belgrade =

The Tourist Organization of Belgrade (TOB) is a public service of the Belgrade City Assembly established with the objective to present, develop and promote tourist values of Belgrade, the Serbian capital city.

In 1995, TOB assumed the legal continuity of the Tourist Federation of Belgrade (Serbian: Turistički savez Beograda), which was founded in 1953.
